Joy Bhadra Hagjer (1914–1973) was an Indian politician. He held many portfolios in the Assam Legislative Assembly. During the period of his demise, he was undivided Assam's Minister of Veterinary, Jails and Minority Affairs as on 18 July 1973. He belongs to the indigenous Dimasa community. He was honoured being founder president of Bodo Sahitya Sabha as its President. and there are also some colleges in the state named after him.

Early life and education

Joy Bhadra Hagjer was born in the tiny village named Nanadisa located near Haflong. He earned his Bachelor of Arts from Murari Chand College, Sylhet.

References

External links
 http://164.100.47.5/Newmembers/mpterms.aspx

1914 births
1973 deaths
Members of the Assam Legislative Assembly
Indian independence activists from Assam
Members of the Constituent Assembly of India
People from Dima Hasao district
Murari Chand College alumni
Dimasa people